The 2005–06 A Group was the 58th season of the top Bulgarian national football league (commonly referred to as A Group) and the 82nd edition of a Bulgarian national championship tournament.

Overview
It was contested by 16 teams, and Levski Sofia won the championship.
PFC Vidima-Rakovski Sevlievo, Nesebar, and Spartak Varna were relegated to the B PFG at the end of the last season. The relegated teams were replaced by Vihren Sandanski, Pirin 1922 Blagoevgrad, and Botev Plovdiv.  Vihren made their debut in the top tier of Bulgarian football, while both Pirin 1922 and Botev return after a one-year absence.

League table

Results

Champions
Levski Sofia

Vergilov and Chilikov left the club during a season.

Top scorers

References

External links
Bulgaria - List of final tables (RSSSF)
2005–06 Statistics of A Group at a-pfg.com

First Professional Football League (Bulgaria) seasons
Bulgaria
1